The R624 is a Regional Route in South Africa.

Route
Its western terminus is the R56 near Richmond. It runs east to link up with the R603 south of Mpumalanga.

References

Regional Routes in KwaZulu-Natal